James Lumley McGeorge (born 8 June 1945) is an English former professional footballer who played in the Football League for Leyton Orient and Mansfield Town.

References

1945 births
Living people
English footballers
Association football forwards
English Football League players
Spennymoor United F.C. players
Leyton Orient F.C. players
Mansfield Town F.C. players
Cambridge City F.C. players
Footballers from Sunderland